The first season of Hart of Dixie an American television series, originally aired in the United States on The CW from September 26, 2011, through May 14, 2012. The season was produced by CBS Television Studios. The pilot, which was announced in February 2011, it was ordered to series in May 2011. On October 12, 2011, The CW picked up Hart of Dixie for a full season which will consist of 22 episodes. On May 11, 2012, The CW renewed the show for a second season.

Overview
The first season mostly revolves around Zoe adjusting to life in Bluebell and struggling to bring in 30% of the patients to her practice; a clause she needs to adhere to if she wishes to keep half from Brick. She finds this difficult as she is at odds with most of the local residents due to her city persona. Zoe also struggles with her growing feelings towards George Tucker, feelings of which his fiancée Lemon is fully aware, leading her to make it her mission to ensure Zoe leaves Bluebell. Other storylines include Wade's feelings for Zoe which may or may not be returned, Zoe's friendship with the mayor, Lavon, and his past with Lemon, and Zoe's unresolved issues regarding her family.

Cast and characters

Regular
 Rachel Bilson as Dr. Zoe Hart
 Scott Porter as George Tucker
 Jaime King as Lemon Breeland
 Cress Williams as Lavon Hayes
 Wilson Bethel as  Wade Kinsella
 Tim Matheson as Dr. Brick Breeland (Recurring episodes 1–14)

Recurring
 Nadine Velazquez as Didi Ruano
 Reginald VelJohnson as Dash DeWitt
 McKaley Miller as Rose Hattenbarger
 Claudia Lee as Magnolia Breeland
 Mircea Monroe as Tansy Truitt
 Brandi Burkhardt as Crickett Watts
 Kaitlyn Black as Annabeth Nass
 Eisa Davis as Addie Pickett 
 Wes Brown as Dr. Judson Lyons
 Armelia McQueen as Shula Whitaker
 JoBeth Williams as Candice Hart
 John Marshall Jones as Wally Maynard
 Ross Philips as Tom Long
 Mallory Moye as Wanda Lewis
 Deborah S. Craig as Shelley Ng
 Steven M. Porter as Frank Moth
 Peter Mackenzie as Reverend Peter Mayfair
 Christopher Curry as Earl Kinsella
 John Eric Bentley as Sheriff Bill
 Kim Robillard as Sal
 Dawn Didawick as Old Lady
 Esther Scott as Delma Warner
 Nancy Travis as Emmeline Hattenbarger
 Ann Cusack as Annie Hattenbarger
 Mary Page Keller as Emily Chase
 Carla Renata as Susie
 Ilene Graff as Clora Tucker

Special Guest Star
 Justin Hartley as Jesse Kinsella
 Meredith Monroe as Alice Kincaid

Episodes

Production

Development
In February 2011, it was announced Hart of Dixie was in development on The CW, was written by Leila Gerstein. In May 2011, Hart of Dixie officially picked up to series. On October 12, 2011, the series received a back nine order for a full season consist of 22 episodes. The show's executive producer Josh Schwartz, compared the show to The WB classics such as Felicity, Everwood and Gilmore Girls.

Casting
Rachel Bilson was cast as Zoe Hart, followed Wilson Bethel as Wade Kinsella, Zoe's "gorgeous bad-boy" neighbor in February. In March Jaime King as Lemon Breeland, Cress Williams as Lavon Hayes, and Scott Porter was later cast as good-looking lawyer George Tucker, a potential love-interest for Bilson's character.

Broadcast
Season one of Hart of Dixie premiered on The CW in the United States on Monday September 26, 2011 at 9:00 pm, with the season five premiere of Gossip Girl as its lead-in.

Reception
On the review aggregator Rotten Tomatoes the first season has an approval rating of 35% based on 17 reviews, with an average rating of 3.9/10. The site's critical consensus reads, "It's got a solid cast, but Hart of Dixie is unfortunately rife with paper-thin characters and illogical plotting."

Home release
Hart of Dixie: The Complete First Season was released on DVD in the U.S. on October 2, 2012. The 5 disc set includes all 22 episodes from the first season, special features and various language and subtitle options.

References

2011 American television seasons
2012 American television seasons